"Ain't That Just the Way" is a song written by Bruce Belland, Glen Larson and Stu Phillips. American model, actress and singer Barbi Benton originally recorded it for release as the B-side of her 1975 single "The Reverend Bob". It became a major hit in Scandinavia, especially in Sweden, topping the Swedish singles chart for 10 weeks in 1977. It also topped the charts in Finland. In 1978, it appeared on her album with the same name, released only in Scandinavia. The song was performed in the McCloud TV series. In 1996, Lutricia McNeal's cover of "Ain't That Just the Way" became a hit in Europe and New Zealand.

Charts

Lutricia McNeal version

American singer Lutricia McNeal released her version of "Ain't That Just the Way" as her debut single in 1996. It was included on her debut album, My Side of Town, in 1997. The single became a hit in Europe, topping the Swedish Singles Chart on the week of November 15, 1996, and reaching the top five in Austria, Germany, the Netherlands, and Switzerland. It also found success in New Zealand, peaking at number two for four weeks and becoming McNeal's highest-charting single in the country until 1999, when "My Side of Town" reached number one.

In 2020, McNeal re-recorded her vocals for "Ain't That Just the Way", which were used in a new version of this song, recorded by German DJ Charming Horses and released on 13 March 2020.

Background and release
Lutricia McNeal first came to notice as the lead singer of Swedish dance act Rob'n'Raz. Their 1993-hit "In Command" went to number one in Sweden. In 1995 their manager, Jonas Siljemark, convinced McNeal to try some solo recordings for his own Siljemark label. She recorded an cover on Barbi Benton's 1975 song "Ain't That Just the Way", which topped the Swedish Singles Chart for 10 weeks in 1977.

After peaking at number one in Sweden in 1996, "Ain't That Just the Way" was picked up by Dutch radio programmers early in 1997. It sold 55,000 units there, then the record broke into neighboring Germany. Later, it gained popularity in Belgium, Austria and Switzerland. In November 1997 "Ain't That Just the Way" debuted and peaked at number six on the UK Singles Chart, and in April 1998 it reached number two on the New Zealand Singles Chart for four consecutive weeks.

McNeal won the Best Newcomer award for "Ain't That Just The Way" at the 1997 Swedish Dance Awards.

Critical reception
Larry Flick from Billboard wrote that McNeal "earns high marks on her first single if only for not falling into the trap of mimicking Mary J. Blige or Brandy like nearly every other jeep-soul diva in waiting. Instead, she aims to forge her own original path, belting with little attitude and absolutely no affectation. The result is a wonderfully charming, instantly infectious recording that leaves you hankering for more. For trend followers, the groove chugs at a spirited hip hop pace, blossoming into a full-bodied pop sing-along at the chorus. It's anyone's guess which format will climb aboard first—and it hardly matters since this smacks with across-the-board appeal." Adrian Thrills from Daily Mail viewed it as "sassy", adding that the singer is "mixing the soulful swagger of Donna Summer with a flapper-girl elegance reminiscent of the Pointer Sisters".

Dave Sholin from the Gavin Report commented that American-born McNeal "had to travel over-seas to follow her star, but based on this debut single, that star is about to follow her home. Originally from Oklahoma City, she wound up in Sweden where she fell in love, got married, and also hit the top of the charts. That success has since spread to Germany, Austria, and Switzerland. This song is next set to hit the streets in the U.S.A. and the UK. It's easy to get caught up in the flow of this cool entry." Pan-European magazine Music & Media noted that the singer's cover "features an urban soul sound which is finding favour in playlist meetings at CHR, rock and dance stations alike." Dave Fawbert from ShortList complimented the song as a "great little tune".

Music video
The accompanying music video for "Ain't That Just the Way" was directed by Swedish director and photographer Patric Ullaeus.

Track listing

 Sweden CD single (1996)
 "Ain't That Just the Way" (original version) (3:34) 
 "Ain't That Just the Way" (extended version) (4:28)

 Sweden CD single (The Remixes) (1996)
 "Ain't That Just the Way" (radio edit) (3:22) 
 "Ain't That Just the Way" (Hurb's Mix) (4:53) 
 "Ain't That Just the Way" (extended version) (4:27) 
 "Ain't That Just the Way" (EZ's vinyl version) (4:21) 
 "Ain't That Just the Way" (Stripped extended version) (3:54) 
 "Ain't That Just the Way" (original version) (3:34)

 UK and Ireland: CD maxi (1997)
 "Ain't That Just the Way" (original mix) (3:11) 
 "Ain't That Just the Way" (Steve Antony R&B (Edit)) (4:03) 
 "Ain't That Just the Way" (Steve Antony Rok Dat Club Mix) (5:15) 
 "Ain't That Just the Way" (Baby Bud Mix) (3:33) 
 "Ain't That Just the Way" (In Da City Mix) (6:43) 
 "Ain't That Just the Way" (Steve Antony R&B Mix) (5:31)

Charts

Weekly charts

Year-end charts

Certifications

Release history

Other versions
In 2007 Anna Book recorded the song on the album Samba Sambero.
Ingela "Pling" Forsman wrote lyrics in Swedish, "Är det inte så", and in that language it was recorded by Wizex on the 1977 album Som en sång and by Friends on the 2002 album Dance with Me

References

Anna Book songs
1975 singles
1975 songs
1996 debut singles
CNR Music singles
Crave Records singles
East West Records singles
Friends (Swedish band) songs
Music videos directed by Patric Ullaeus
Number-one singles in Sweden
Songs written by Bruce Belland
Songs written by Glen A. Larson
Wizex songs